Ursula Gregg (née Konzett, born 15 November 1959 in Grabs, Switzerland) is a Liechtensteiner former Alpine skier.

Career

Olympic Games 
 Alpine skiing at the 1984 Winter Olympics (in Sarajevo, Yugoslavia).
  Bronze medal in slalom

World Championships 
 1982 (in Schladming, Austria).
  Bronze medal in giant slalom

World Cup 
 6th overall in the 1982 Alpine Skiing World Cup
2nd slalom overall

Per season 
 World Cup 1982
 Slalom : 2 victories (in Lenggries, Germany and in Waterville Valley, New Hampshire, USA).

References

External links
 

1959 births
Liechtenstein female alpine skiers
Olympic alpine skiers of Liechtenstein
Olympic bronze medalists for Liechtenstein
Alpine skiers at the 1976 Winter Olympics
Alpine skiers at the 1980 Winter Olympics
Alpine skiers at the 1984 Winter Olympics
Living people
Olympic medalists in alpine skiing
Medalists at the 1984 Winter Olympics